İspir (Sper; , Speri) is a town and district of Erzurum Province in the Eastern Anatolia region of Turkey, on the Çoruh River. They also appear as the Sasperi, the name Sper with a Georgian prefix of place Sa-, which evolved into the term Iberian. The mayor is Ahmet Coşkun (MHP). The district has a population of 30,260 while the town has a population of 11,789.

History

İspir is known from the 3rd millennium BC.  The ancient kingdom of Hayasa-Azzi (2nd millennium BC), which was the forerunner of Armenian statehood, was located in the upper reaches of the rivers Euphrates and Chorokh, and included Sper. The name Sper is thought by some to be derived from Saspers, a tribe mentioned by Xenophon;

In the 4th-3rd centuries BC Sper was organized into a province of the Iberian Kingdom as noted by Strabo.  Alexander the Great sent one of his generals Menon to conquer Sper, but Menon and his forces were defeated and killed.  The region was then a part of Upper Armenia (Bardzr Hayk'), a province of Greater Armenia, since the 2nd century BC to the 5th century AD. After this, Sper was an Armenian Bagratid domain in the 4th - 6th centuries, the territory of which also comprised the Bayburt plain until that was lost to the Byzantines (perhaps in 387).

In the 7th century it passed to the Arab Caliphate; in 885 Bagratuni Kingdom of Armenia. Under the medieval Kingdom of Armenia, it was part of the province of Upper Armenia and was famous for its gold mines. In the 11th century it was conquered by the Seljuqs. Ispir was under the control of the Saltukids till 1124 when the Georgians took over power, governed by Zakare and Ivane Zakarids as a fief. It was recaptured by Mughith ad Din Tughrul, son of the Seljuk sultan Kilij Arslan II, sometime between 1201 and 1225. He built a mosque in the citadel which still survives. It was conquered in 1242 by the Mongols; was regained by Georgian Kingdom during the reign of George V the Brilliant (1314–1346), it remained part of the Kingdom before its disintegration, which then passed into the hands of Georgian Atabegs belonging to the House of Jaqeli; it was conquered in 1502 by Persia and was probably in 1515 taken by the Ottoman Empire from the Georgian ruler of Samtskhe. 

The town was occupied in 1916 by the Russians during World War I and the Armenian genocide, then was recaptured by the Turks in 1918.

Historic sights in the town are the citadel, a mosque and a church in the citadel (probably 13th century), the originally 13th century Çarsi mosque's building being a recent structure. The Sultan Melik mosque and Madrasa built in the 13th century, the Madrasa of Kadizade Mehmet built in 1725/26, Kadizade was the Mufti of Erzurum from 1744 to 1759 and his father was the Qadi of Ispir. There is also a tomb with a graveyard containing some Ottoman tombstones.

Climate
The climate is described as Humid Continental by the Köppen Climate System, abbreviated as Dfb.

Economy

As of 1920, coal was being produced in the area.

References

External links
The website of the governor of İspir
The website of the tourism info

Populated places in Erzurum Province
Former provinces of Georgia (country)
Historical regions of Georgia (country)
Tao-Klarjeti
Districts of Erzurum Province
Towns in Turkey